Bristol Bears Women, formerly Clifton Ladies RFC, then Bristol Ladies, is a women's rugby union team based in Bristol, England. They are a standalone, independent rugby club, running in partnership with the Bristol Bears (formerly Bristol Rugby) since becoming affiliated to them in 2008 and play their home matches at Dings RFC in the Premier 15s.

History 
Bristol Ladies were founded as Clifton Ladies RFC in 1984 for what was intended as a one-off match against Weston Hornets. They eventually made it into the Women's Premiership before being relegated. In 2002, they defeated Nottingham Medoc Casuals in the RFUW Rugby World National Cup Final at Franklin's Gardens in Northampton, Northamptonshire, which they won with thirteen international players in their side. They were the first club outside of the London clubs of Richmond Women, Saracens Women and Wasps Ladies to win the trophy. In 2007, they were promoted back into the Women's Premiership and played one more season as Clifton RFC. In 2009, Clifton became affiliated to Bristol Rugby, who then took over the running of the team from Clifton RFC. In 2012, they moved to Portway Rugby Development Centre from Dings Crusaders Rugby Football Club's ground that they were sharing with Dings Crusaders. This made them the first women's rugby club to own their own facilities.

Notable players 
At the 2017 Women's Rugby World Cup three Bristol Ladies players captained their national teams. Sarah Hunter, Carys Phillips and Claire Molloy  captained England, Wales and Ireland respectively.
  internationals

  internationals

  sevens internationals 
 Natasha Hunt
 Amy Wilson-Hardy
  internationals 
 Claire Molloy 
 Larissa Muldoon

References 

Women's rugby union teams in England
Rugby clubs established in 1984
Rugby union in Bristol
Bristol Bears